Lords of the Expanse is a 1988 role-playing game supplement published by West End Games for Star Wars: The Roleplaying Game.

Contents
Lords of the Expanse is a sector guide detailing the Tampani Sector and the political machinations of its noble houses.

The box contains:
 Campaign Guide
 Gamemaster Guide
 Sector Guide

Reviews
Dragon #243

References

Role-playing game supplements introduced in 1988
Star Wars: The Roleplaying Game supplements